Luosifen is a Chinese noodle soup and specialty of Liuzhou, Guangxi. The dish consists of rice noodles boiled and served in a soup. The stock that forms the soup is made by stewing river snails and pork bones for several hours with black cardamom, fennel seed, dried tangerine peel, cassia bark, cloves, white pepper, bay leaf, licorice root, sand ginger, and star anise. It usually does not contain snail meat, but it is instead served with pickled bamboo shoot, pickled green beans, shredded wood ear, fu zhu, fresh green vegetables, peanuts, and chili oil added to the soup. Diners can also add chili, green onions, white vinegar, and green peppers to suit their taste.

Pickled bamboo shoots add to the famously strong smell of this dish, which may affect men more than women.  The dish is served in small "hole-in-the-wall" restaurants, as well as luxury hotel restaurants. In the late 2010s, many luosifen restaurants have opened in Beijing, Shanghai, and Hong Kong, as well as in other countries such as the US.  Instant noodle versions are also very popular, with 2.5 million packets produced daily in 2019.

History
The origin of luosifen is not certain, but many believe it originated in the late 1970s and early 1980s. There are three legends that attempt to explain its origin.

First legend
According to a legend in the 1980s, some starving tourists traveled to Liuzhou in the evening and came across a rice noodle restaurant that was closed; however, the owner still served them. The bone soup, usually the main soup, was out of order, and only snail soup was available. The owner poured cooked rice noodles into the snail soup and served the tourists with vegetables, peanuts, and a bean curd stick side dish. The tourists liked the dish, which led to the owner improving the recipe and production process, slowly shaping the prototype of snail noodle soup.

Second legend
In the mid 1980s, there was a dry cut noodles grocery store on Jiefang South Road in Liuzhou. After studying in the morning, the shop's clerk decided to boil rice noodles with snails for breakfast. It is speculated that the old woman's snail stall is inside the goldfish lane of Jiefang South Road.

The lady thought the noodle soup was delicious, so she started to sell it as the "snail noodle". After years of improvement by local operators, the authentic Liuzhou snail noodle soup was created.

Third legend
In the late 1970s and early 1980s, the folk commercial trade in Liuzhou began to recover slowly from the Cultural Revolution. The Liuzhou workers' cinema was very popular during this time. Driven by the strong audience of these films, Gubu Street Night Market gradually formed.

Some people came up with an idea: river snails and rice noodles cooked together as food. After a film was over, customers accidentally asked the shopkeeper to add oil, water, and snail soup powder to the mixture. Over time, the recipe was perfected to suit the needs of customers, and the snail noodle dish gradually took shape. As the first original snack in Liuzhou, snail noodle soup has gradually become a landmark food in Liuzhou and even Guangxi.

Recent development 

Mass production of packaged luosifen started in late 2014, making it a nationwide household food. The yearly sales of packaged luosifen reached 6 billion yuan in 2019. Sales of packaged luosifen increased during the COVID-19 pandemic.

Dish preparation 
Luosifen noodles are rice noodles that are boiled and placed in a soup or broth that consists of local river snails and pork bones. The broth is boiled with river snails and pork bones for three to ten hours; the snails give it a mild, sweet flavor. Other herbs and spices can be boiled for the broth, including black cardamom, fennel seeds, dried tangerine peel, cassia barks, salt, pepper, bay leaves, licorice roots, sand ginger, and star anise. The noodles can be made from older rice noodles for a chewier and firmer texture. Fried dried bean curd sticks, pickled bamboo shoots, black fungus, lettuce, peanuts, and preserved cowpeas can be added for flavor. These are the most common ingredients used in restaurants that serve these "smelly" noodles.

The dish itself does not contain snail meat. Instead, the dish consists of other types of meat or seafood, as well as vegetables like cabbages. At restaurants and food stalls, customers can order their noodles with pork, beef, chicken, shrimp, or other meat and seafood. Additions like chili oil and pickles can enhance the dish.

It is difficult to cook the dish, and recipes are rare. The easiest way to receive luosifen is at restaurants or by ordering prepackaged portions online or at a local market. Due to the limited information available, it is difficult to discern the authentic recipe. Many restaurants use tomatoes, leafy greens, diced chicken, chili oil, and chestnuts to enhance and balance the flavor. Others make it spicy by adding more peppers or chili. Some use sesame oil, red chili, jalapeños, tofu, cumin, and other spices to bring out the pungent flavor of the noodles and broth.

Prepackaged instant luosifen noodles are prepared like instant ramen. The consumer boils water and adds the prepared sauce or other vegetables that comes with the package.

Ingredients

The ingredients of river snail noodles are sour bamboo shoots, yuba, fungus, peanuts, and dried radishes. Some noodle stalls have sauerkraut, head vegetables, and shallots. Green vegetables are also an important ingredient for river snail noodles. Side dishes include duck feet, tofu, sausage, and marinated eggs. In the summer, stalls sell water spinach and Chinese cabbage, and, in winter, they sell lettuce, Yau Ma vegetables, mushrooms, cauliflower, and pea seedlings.

Luosifen is nicknamed a "bioweapon" by some due to its fecal-like odor, while enthusiasts believe that the scent gives the soul to the soup. Chemically, the scent comes from the fermentative pickling process of the sour bamboo shoots, which converts the amino acids cysteine and tryptophan to hydrogen sulfide and skatole respectively. Many locations and instant food manufacturers provide the option to exclude this topping.

Preparation
The dish is based on rice noodles and various ingredients including fermented bamboo shoots, Guda ears (a particular type of lignicolous mushrooms), fried peanuts, tofu, huanghuacai, fresh salad, and river snails, accompanied by sour-spicy seasonings. Luosifen soup also contains pork bones with spices, which are stewed for about two hours.

The main ingredient of the soup is dried Liuzhou rice noodles. Unlike others, Liuzhou rice noodles are produced only with aged rice that has already lost its fat and gelatin component; this is why they are cooked al dente. They are immersed in cold water before they are added to the soup.

Location 

Luosifen noodles are a combination of Han, Miao, and Dong cuisine. From the Guangxi Zhuang region in South China, they are exported to other parts of China, the US, and Canada. When the noodles are exported to the US, they are sold in ready-to-cook packages. Luosifen is popular in Guangxi Zhuang due to the region's ethnic diversity. Liuzhou is known for luosifen noodles.

In Vietnam, a variation of luosifen – Bún ốc – is served. Originating in Hanoi, Bún ốc is a snail-based noodle dish usually served with fried green banana and fried tofu. It is served as a side-dish or appetizer rather than a main course. Bún ốc can be found in nooks, street food stalls, and luxury restaurants. Traditional luosifen noodles are also sold.

Luosifen can also be found in luxury restaurants worldwide. Some were first established in Beijing, Shanghai, and Hong Kong; they have also developed overseas. Altogether, there are over five thousand luosifen restaurants in China, Canada, and the United States. Seattle is one American city that has luosifen restaurants. The dish can vary depending on the region. Most variations stay true to the base, while adding different toppings and proteins, including preserved vegetables, soy products, egg, pork knuckles, and duck feet.

Luosifen noodles are also becoming popular worldwide through Chinese online store Taobao, which is one of the world's top-10 most visited websites. The store hosts 5,000 luosifen noodle shops and sells a daily average of 200,000 noodle packs.

See also
Bún ốc, a snail-based noodle dish in Vietnam
Rice noodles

References

Guangxi cuisine
Chinese noodle dishes
Liuzhou